Dingxing County is a county under the jurisdiction of the prefecture-level city of Baoding in central Hebei province, People's Republic of China. It is served by China National Highway 107 and G4 Beijing–Hong Kong and Macau Expressway.

Administrative divisions
There are 5 towns and 11 townships under the county's administration.

Towns:
Dingxing, Gucheng, Xianyu, Beihe, Tiangongsi

Townships:
 Donglaobo Township, Gaoli Township, Zhangjiazhuang Township, Yaocun Township, Xiaocun Township, Liudiao Township, Yangcun Township, Beitian Township, Beinancai Township, Liyuzhuang Township, Xiaozhuzhuang Township

References

External links
Dingxing County official website
 Yicihui Stone Column
 Yicihui Stone Pillar
 Ciyun Tower in Dingxing, Hebei Province (Yuan Dynasty, 1306)
  Renovation of Ciyun Pavilion in Dingxing County]
 Toward the Definition of a Yuan Dynasty Hall
 The Temple to the Northern Peak in Quyang

 
Geography of Baoding
County-level divisions of Hebei